Surfshark is a VPN service located in the Netherlands. In 2021 Surfshark merged with Nord Security. However, both companies still operate independently. 

Surfshark offers products such as a virtual private network (VPN) service, a data leak detection system, and a private search tool.

History
Surfshark was launched in 2018 by introducing its first VPN application for iOS devices. In 2018, Surfshark underwent an external audit by a German cybersecurity firm Cure53, but just for their browser extensions. Surfshark has 3,200+ servers in 100 countries.

Surfshark's founding is opaque as the company was first headquartered in the British Virgin Islands. Because all publicly disclosed employees of Surfshark, including its CEO, have Lithuanian names, it is fair to assume that the operation has ties to the Baltic region. This theory is supported by Surfshark's parent company Nord Security having received funding from a Lithuanian startup accelerator and having an office located in Lithuania. 

In September 2019, Surfshark launched an Android app called Trust DNS. The app works as a DNS resolver that can provide access to websites in highly restrictive countries. In October 2019, Surfshark became one of the first ten VPN packages to receive an official seal of approval granted by an independent IT-Security Institute AV-TEST. In 2020, Surfshark was named the best VPN of 2020 by CNN.

In 2021, Surfshark was named Best VPN by the Trusted Reviews Awards. 

In mid-2021, Surfshark began the process to merge with their competitor Nord Security, parent company of the popular NordVPN. The merger was finalised in early 2022, with both brands continuing to operate independently.

In 2022, Surfshark closed its physical servers in India in response to the CERT-In's order for VPN companies to store consumers’ personal data for a period of five years.

Surfshark was included in CNET's 2022 Best Overall VPN list.

Technology
In December 2019, Surfshark implemented GPS-Spoofing for Android, allowing users to hide their device’s physical geo-location by changing it to one of the server’s locations. In its applications, Surfshark uses IKEv2, OpenVPN and WireGuard tunneling protocols. All data transferred via Surfshark servers is encrypted using an AES-256-GCM encryption standard.

In July 2020, Surfshark announced its entire server network is running on RAM-only servers. In October 2021, Surfshark announced they would be relocating from the British Virgin Islands to The Netherlands, primarily for business reasons.

In August 2022, Surfshark exclusively partnered with digital rights watchdog NetBlocks for greater reporting on internet shutdowns. Surfshark also added a manual WireGuard connection feature in August.

Surfshark VPN service features include: Kill Switch, MultiHop, and Bypasser. It also offers an ad and malware prevention feature CleanWeb that blocks ads on the DNS level. The double VPN Multihop feature routes traffic through two servers instead of one, thereby providing better security. Surfshark's Bypasser is a VPN split tunneling feature.

References 

Virtual private network services
Internet properties established in 2018
Dutch brands